Kensington Community High School is a high school in Melbourne, Australia.

References

Secondary schools in Melbourne
Educational institutions established in 1975
1975 establishments in Australia
Buildings and structures in the City of Melbourne (LGA)